The women's heptathlon event at the 1999 European Athletics U23 Championships was held in Göteborg, Sweden, at Ullevi on 31 July and 1 August 1999.

Medalists

Results

Final
31 July-1 August

Participation
According to an unofficial count, 13 athletes from 11 countries participated in the event.

 (1)
 (1)
 (1)
 (1)
 (1)
 (1)
 (1)
 (1)
 (2)
 (1)
 (2)

References

Heptathlon
Combined events at the European Athletics U23 Championships